This is a listing of the municipalities of Estonia by the land area as of 2005.

The land area is expressed in km², and the density is expressed in inhabitants per km² of land area.

 
Municipalities of Estonia by area
Estonia